Jack Straw's Castle may refer to:
 a place associated with Jack Straw's Lane, Oxfordshire
 Jack Straw's Castle, Hampstead